Cosautlán in Veracruz, Mexico. It is located in the montane central zone of the State of Veracruz, about 23.5 km from state capital Xalapa. It has a surface of 72.38 km2. The town has 2224 men and 2393 women.

The municipality of  Cosautlán  is delimited to the north by Teocelo, to the south by Tlaltetela, to the east by Tlaltetela, to the south by Oteapan, and to the west by Ixhuacán de los Reyes.

It produces principally maize and beans.

In  Cosautlán , in May takes place the celebration in honor to San Isidro Labrador, Patron of the town.

The weather in  Cosautlán  is cold all year with rains in summer and autumn.

References

External links 

  Municipal Official webpage
  Municipal Official Information

Municipalities of Veracruz